İlkay Durmuş (born 1 May 1994) is a Turkish professional footballer who plays as a winger for Ekstraklasa club Lechia Gdańsk. Born in Germany, he represented Turkey as a youth international.

Club career
Durmuş joined Floridsdorfer AC in Austria in January 2015. He made his Süper Lig debut on 18 May 2014.

In July 2019, Durmuş signed a two-year deal with Scottish club St Mirren.

Career statistics

References

External links
 
 
 
 

1994 births
Living people
Footballers from Stuttgart
Turkish footballers
Association football defenders
Turkey youth international footballers
German footballers
German people of Turkish descent
Gençlerbirliği S.K. footballers
Antalyaspor footballers
SC Austria Lustenau players
FC Wacker Innsbruck (2002) players
St Mirren F.C. players
Lechia Gdańsk players
Süper Lig players
Ekstraklasa players
Scottish Professional Football League players
Turkish expatriate footballers
German expatriate footballers
Turkish expatriate sportspeople in Scotland
German expatriate sportspeople in Scotland
Expatriate footballers in Scotland
Turkish expatriate sportspeople in Austria
German expatriate sportspeople in Austria
Expatriate footballers in Austria
Turkish expatriate sportspeople in Poland
German expatriate sportspeople in Poland
Expatriate footballers in Poland
SV Ried players
Floridsdorfer AC players